Mohammad Reza Foroutan (born December 28, 1968, in Tehran) is an Iranian actor and singer.

Life
Mohammad Reza Foroutan was born on December 28, 1968, in Tehran.He has started acting since 1994.He studied Health Psychology. He currently holds a PhD in Health Psychology.

Career

His first film was Goal. After some minor roles, his performance in an episode of TV series The Clue revealed his capabilities and Masoud Kimiay chose him for the leading role of Mercedes. He has received several awards including the best male actor award for acting in Ghermez at the 1999 Fajr International Film Festival and best male actor award for acting in Be Ahestegi at the 2005 Fajr International Film Festival.

Filmography 
 1994: Goal
 1994: The Last Port (Akharin Bandar)
 Winner
 1995: The Moon and the Sun (Mah va Khorshid)
 1998: Mercedes
 1998: Red (Ghermez)
 1999: Two Women (Do Zan)
 1999: Cry (Faryad)
 2000: Protest (Eteraz)
 The Yalda Night (Shab-e Yalda)
 2001: Under the Skin of the City (Zir-e poost-e Shahr)
 2001: Born Under Libra (Motevalede mahe mehr) 
 2001: Dance with Dream (Ba Roya Beraghs)
 2003: Meet the Parrot (Molaghat ba tooti)
 2004: Friday's Soldiers (Sarbaz-haye Jome)
 2005: Octopus (Hashtpa)
 2005: Top of the Tower (Nok-e Borj) 
 2006: When everyone was asleep (Vaghti hame khab boodand)
 2006: Cold Soil (Khak-e sard)
 2006: Gradually (Be Ahestegi) 
 2006: Loser (Bazande) 
 2007: The Night Bus
 2007: Second Woman (Zan-e Dovom)
 2008: Canaan
 2008: Invitation (Davat)
 2014: Tales (Ghesse-ha)
 2017: Negar
 2019: Symphony No. 9

References

External links
 

Iranian male film actors
Iranian male television actors
1968 births
People from Tehran
Living people
Islamic Azad University alumni
Crystal Simorgh for Best Actor winners